Brian Bouldrey is a United States writer and actor.

Life
He is a Senior Lecturer in Northwestern University's English Department. At Northwestern, he founded the Creative Non-Fiction writing sequence, which he currently teaches.
He is also a Visiting Writer at Lesley University.

Bibliography

Fiction
 The Genius of Desire, 1995
 Love, the Magician, 2000
 The Boom Economy: Or, Scenes from Clerical Life, 2003

Nonfiction
 The Autobiography Box, 1999
 Monster: Gay Adventures in American Machismo, 2001
 Honorable Bandit: A Walk Across Corsica, (2007, Terrace Books)

Anthologies edited
 Best American Gay Fiction, 1993
 Wrestling with the Angel: Faith and Religion in the Lives of Gay Men, 1995
 Best American Gay Fiction, 1996
 Best American Gay Fiction, 1998
 Traveling Souls: Contemporary Pilgrimage Stories, 1999
 Writing Home: Award-Winning Literature from the New West, 1999

Awards
 Lambda Literary Award, 1996
 Joseph Henry Jackson Award, 1998

References

External links
Official website
Homepage at Northwestern
"BRIAN BOULDREY", Blackbird Review

Year of birth missing (living people)
Living people
Northwestern University faculty
American gay writers
20th-century American novelists
20th-century American male writers
Lambda Literary Award winners
American male novelists
21st-century American novelists
American LGBT novelists
21st-century American male writers
Novelists from Illinois
20th-century American non-fiction writers
21st-century American non-fiction writers
American male non-fiction writers
21st-century American LGBT people